Boulton, Watt and Murdoch is a gilded bronze statue depicting Matthew Boulton, James Watt, and William Murdoch by William Bloye, assisted by Raymond Forbes Kings. It stands on a plinth of Portland stone.

It has often been described as Messrs Lee and Longland discussing a roll of wallpaper with a customer and is also known as The Golden Boys after its colour, or The Carpet Salesmen after the partially rolled-up plan of a steam engine which they are examining. 

In 1939 an £8,000 bequest from Richard Wheatley, and £7,500 from the City Council, enabled the work to be created and it was unveiled in 1956, from preliminary designs drawn up in 1938. In 1956 the statue was erected temporarily outside the Birmingham Register Office which is where it stood until the statue was restored and re-gilded in September 2006. It was moved into storage on 23 August 2017 to permit construction of the West Midlands Metro. After almost 5 years, the statue was lowered into place on the plinth in Centenary Square outside of Symphony Hall on the 29th April 2022.

See also
St. Mary's Church, Handsworth (memorials inside the church)
Soho Manufactory
Soho Foundry
Soho Mint
Boulton & Watt steam engine
Matthew Boulton
James Watt
William Murdoch
William Bloye

References

General
Public Sculpture of Birmingham including Sutton Coldfield, George T. Noszlopy, edited Jeremy Beach, 1998,

External links

 Birmingham City Council page about the statue

Lunar Society of Birmingham
Outdoor sculptures in England
1956 sculptures
Gold sculptures
Bronze sculptures in the United Kingdom
Statues in England
1956 establishments in England
Sculptures in Birmingham, West Midlands